Ryhall & Belmesthorpe railway station (originally Ryhall & Belmisthorpe) was a station in Belmesthorpe and about half a mile from Ryhall, both in Rutland. It was the only intermediate station on the Stamford and Essendine Railway, later Great Northern Railway, single track line between Stamford and Essendine. It was sited south of a level crossing at the west end of the village. The goods yard was to the north of the level crossing.

References

Disused railway stations in Rutland
Former Great Northern Railway stations
Railway stations in Great Britain opened in 1856
Railway stations in Great Britain closed in 1959